Heteroponera leae is a species of ant in the genus Heteroponera. It is endemic to Australia, and was described by Wheeler in 1923. It has a similar appearance to Heteroponera crozieri ants, although H. crozieri ants are more northerly distributed.

References

Heteroponerinae
Hymenoptera of Australia
Insects of Australia
Insects described in 1923